Film Portrait (1972) is a full-length autobiographical film directed by, and about, the life of Minnesotan film-maker and artist, Jerome Hill.

Summary
Jerome Hill died shortly after the completion of Film Portrait, and so the work is often described as his memoir from his privileged childhood in the Midwest to his restless adult years.

Legacy
In 2003, Film Portrait was added to the National Film Registry at the Library of Congress, recognizing the cultural, historical and aesthetic significance of the work, as well as ensuring the preservation of the original film footage.

See also
 List of American films of 1972
 Jerome Hill
 Metafilm

References

External links

Excerpt from Film Portrait at the Jerome Foundation
Catalog record at Museum of Modern Art
Film Portrait essay by Daniel Eagan in America's Film Legacy: The Authoritative Guide to the Landmark Movies in the National Film Registry, A&C Black, 2010 , pages 689-690

1972 films
1972 documentary films
American documentary films
Autobiographical documentary films
Films about film directors and producers
Films directed by Jerome Hill
United States National Film Registry films
1970s English-language films
1970s American films